Steve Konopka (born May 12, 1976) is a former tight end/defensive tackle in the Arena Football League. He played most recently for the Utah Blaze 1999 New York Giants NFL defensive tackle.

High school years
Konopka attended Conard High School in West Hartford, Connecticut, where he was a two-time All-State selection.

College years
Konopka attended Central Connecticut State University and was an Exercise Science Major and a letterman in football. In football, he was named the Northeast Conference Player of the Year as a senior.

External links
http://www.arenafan.com/players/?page=players&player=2916&pageview=career ArenaFan.com bio

1976 births
Living people
People from West Hartford, Connecticut
American football tight ends
American football defensive tackles
Central Connecticut Blue Devils football players
Toronto Phantoms players
Las Vegas Gladiators players
Utah Blaze players